Stuart Ian Eccleston (born 4 October 1961) is an English former professional footballer who played as a defender.

Career statistics
Source:

References

1961 births
Living people
Footballers from Stoke-on-Trent
English footballers
Association football defenders
Stoke City F.C. players
Hull City A.F.C. players
Stafford Rangers F.C. players
Port Vale F.C. players
English Football League players
National League (English football) players